Sergei Sergeyevich Plotnikov (born 3 June 1990) is a Russian professional ice hockey forward for HC CSKA Moscow of the Kontinental Hockey League (KHL). Plotnikov previously played in the KHL with Amur Khabarovsk, Lokomotiv Yaroslavl and SKA Saint Petersburg. He has played briefly in the National Hockey League with the Pittsburgh Penguins and the Arizona Coyotes.

Playing career

Plotnikov was not drafted by any NHL team. On 1 July 2015, Plotnikov bought out the final year of his contract with Lokomotiv Yaroslavl. He signed a one-year, entry-level contract with the NHL's Pittsburgh Penguins.

In his first North American season in 2015–16, Plotnikov scored just two points in 32 games. From December 2015, he was a healthy scratch for almost two months. Displeased with his lack of playing time, Plotnikov requested a trade and was subsequently traded to the Arizona Coyotes on 29 February 2016 in exchange for Matthias Plachta and a conditional seventh-round draft pick in 2016, dependent on if the Coyotes resigned him. Plotnikov's struggles continued with the Coyotes, unable to find his offensive touch with one assist from 13 games.

As a free agent from the Coyotes and with little success in the NHL, Plotnikov returned to Russia in agreeing to a two-year KHL contract with SKA Saint Petersburg on 1 July 2016.

Following his fourth season with SKA Saint Petersburg in the 2019–20 season, in which he served as team captain, Plotnikov was traded to his original club, Amur Khabarovsk in exchange for Igor Rudenkov on 16 May 2020. Unable to agree to terms with Amur, Plotnikov was soon traded for the second time within the month, dealt to Metallurg Magnitogorsk in exchange for four prospects and financial compensation. He was then signed to a two-year contract on 28 May 2020.

Following a lone season with Metallurg Magnitogorsk, Plotnikov left the club with a year remaining on his contract in agreeing to a one-year deal with fellow KHL club, HC CSKA Moscow, on 6 July 2021.

International play

Plotnikov won a gold medal with Russia at the 2014 World Championship. He finished the tournament third overall in scoring.

On 23 January 2022, Plotnikov was named to the roster to represent Russian Olympic Committee athletes at the 2022 Winter Olympics.

Career statistics

Regular season and playoffs

International

Awards and honors

References

External links

1990 births
Living people
Amur Khabarovsk players
Amurskie Tigry players
Arizona Coyotes players
HC CSKA Moscow players
Lokomotiv Yaroslavl players
Metallurg Magnitogorsk players
People from Komsomolsk-on-Amur
Pittsburgh Penguins players
Russian expatriate ice hockey people
Russian expatriate sportspeople in the United States
Russian ice hockey left wingers
SKA Saint Petersburg players
Undrafted National Hockey League players
Ice hockey players at the 2022 Winter Olympics
Medalists at the 2022 Winter Olympics
Olympic silver medalists for the Russian Olympic Committee athletes
Olympic medalists in ice hockey
Olympic ice hockey players of Russia
Sportspeople from Khabarovsk Krai